Ground propulsion is any mechanism for propelling solid bodies along the ground, usually for the purposes of transportation. The propulsion system often consists of a combination of an engine or motor, a gearbox and wheel and axles (or caterpillar tracks) in standard applications.

The primary and most natural type of propulsion is the use of muscle power. The invention of the wheel allowed for the development of vehicles like Carts and Wagons that make more efficient use of muscle power, allowing larger loads to be transported. Vehicles drawn by humans and domesticated animals are not economically as important as they once were, but they still exist. Examples of human-powered vehicles are rickshaws and cycle rickshaws.

The development of the steam engine and internal combustion engine allowed for the development of rail vehicles and motor vehicles, all of which have some form of a powertrain. The electric motor allowed for quieter vehicles with lower emissions, and frequently higher engine efficiency.

Some less commonly used or experimental engines are:
Turbines
Stirling engines
Fuel cells

Propulsion